Francis "Frank" Maloney (born 26 May 1973) is an English former professional rugby league footballer who played as a utility back, recognised for his ability to play in the halves and the back line. He played at the top tier of English rugby league for Leeds, Featherstone Rovers, Warrington, Oldham Bears (Heritage № 1032), Castleford Tigers (Heritage № 749), Wakefield Trinity Wildcats (Heritage № 1157), and Salford City Reds. He went on to play for Batley, Dewsbury Rams and the Hunslet Hawks in the Championship before retiring from playing in 2008.

Playing career

International honours
Maloney won caps for England playing  i.e. number 3, in the 28–20 victory over France at Stade Albert Domec, Carcassonne stadium on 13 October 1999, and  i.e. number 3 scoring 2-tries in the 50–20 victory over France, at Hull FC's stadium on 23 October 1999.

Regal Trophy Final appearances
Maloney played  in Warrington's 10–40 defeat by Wigan in the 1994–95 Regal Trophy Final during the 1994–95 season at Alfred McAlpine Stadium, Huddersfield on Saturday 28 January 1995.

Division Two Premiership Final appearances
Maloney played , and scored a try in Featherstone Rovers' 20–16 victory over Workington Town in the 1992–93 Divisional Premiership Final during the 1992–93 season at Old Trafford, Manchester on 19 May 1993.

Financial Crisis at Wakefield Trinity Wildcats
In September 2000, at the height of a financial crisis at Wakefield Trinity Wildcats, the contracts of all players aged over 24 were terminated. The players affected were; Andy Fisher, Bobbie Goulding, Warren Jowitt, Tony Kemp (player-coach), Steve McNamara, Francis Maloney, Martin Masella, Steve Prescott, Bright Sodje, Francis Stephenson and Glen Tomlinson.

Personal life
Maloney is the son of the rugby league footballer who played in the 1960s and 1970s; John Maloney. Maloney is the uncle of the rugby league footballer Dominic Maloney. He lives in Dewsbury, Yorkshire.

References

External links
 (archived by web.archive.org) Batley Bulldogs profile
(archived by web.archive.org) Profile at thecastlefordtigers.co.uk
2001 Super League Team-by-team guide
Statistics at orl-heritagetrust.org.uk
Profile at wolvesplayers.thisiswarrington.co.uk

1973 births
Living people
Batley Bulldogs players
Castleford Tigers players
Dewsbury Rams players
England national rugby league team players
English rugby league players
Featherstone Rovers players
Hunslet R.L.F.C. players
Leeds Rhinos players
Oldham R.L.F.C. players
Rugby league centres
Rugby league five-eighths
Rugby league players from Dewsbury
Salford Red Devils players
Wakefield Trinity players
Warrington Wolves players
Yorkshire rugby league team players